Olivia Wayne (née Godfrey, born 1986) is a British sports journalist, and co-presenter on the Sky Sports television show Good Morning Sports Fans.

Early life
She grew up in Mill Hill, London, the daughter of Jewish parents. She was educated at North London Collegiate School and earned a degree in American and Canadian studies from the University of Birmingham.

Career
She is a presenter on the Sky Sports television show Good Morning Sports Fans.

Personal life
Wayne is married to DJ and producer Zeb Wayne, the son of composer and musician Jeff Wayne, best known for the musical War of the Worlds.

References

1986 births
Living people
Alumni of the University of Birmingham
People educated at North London Collegiate School
People from Mill Hill
Sky Sports presenters and reporters
British sports broadcasters
British women television journalists